Abdoulaye Traoré (born 30 April 2000) is an Italian football player of Ivorian descent .

Club career

Perugia
He made his professional debut in the Serie B for Perugia on 20 September 2016 in a game against Virtus Entella.

Hellas Verona
On 28 July 2018, Traorè signed with Hellas Verona for free.

Loan to Rende
On 2 September 2019, he moved to Serie C club Rende on loan.

Al-Sharjah
On 3 February 2020, Sharjah has signed  Traoré from Hellas Verona.

References

External links
 

2000 births
Footballers from Abidjan
Italian people of Ivorian descent
Italian sportspeople of African descent
Living people
Italian footballers
Italian expatriate footballers
Association football forwards
A.C. Perugia Calcio players
Hellas Verona F.C. players
Sharjah FC players
Serie B players
Serie C players
Expatriate footballers in the United Arab Emirates
Italian expatriate sportspeople in the United Arab Emirates